Homona mermerodes is a species of moth of the family Tortricidae first described by Edward Meyrick in 1910. It was described from the Solomon Islands, but is also found in Australia (Queensland), New Guinea and Seram. The habitat consists of bamboo, secondary forests and alluvial forests.

Adults have blotchy brown forewings and plain brown hindwings.

The larvae are highly polyphagous. They are yellow with a black head. When full grown, they reach a length of about 15 mm.

References

Moths described in 1910
Homona (moth)